Samuel Freedman was a Canadian lawyer and judge.

Samuel Freedman may also refer to:

Samuel G. Freedman (born 1955), American journalist
Samuel O. Freedman (born 1928), Canadian immunologist
Samuel S. Freedman (1927–2012), American jurist and legislator

See also
Samuel Friedman (disambiguation)
Samuel Freeman (disambiguation)